Helen Mary Gaskell (née Melville), CBE, known as May Gaskell (1853–1940) was a society hostess and philanthropist in London who established the British War Library.

Gaskell was a "vivacious but unhappily married society hostess who belonged to the aristocratic circle of friends known as the 'Souls'": she had platonic relationship with the artist Edward Burne-Jones, who wrote her up to six letters a day and painted a famous portrait of her daughter Amy. The letters were only discovered in 2005, when May's great-grandchild Josceline Dimbleby wrote a book about the affair, called "A Profound Secret" 
(US title: "May and Amy: A True Story of Family, Forbidden Love, and the Secret Lives of May Gaskell, Her Daughter Amy, and Sir Edward Burne-Jones"). Burne-Jones also painted May herself.

Gaskell founded the War Library in 1914 and actively ran it throughout the war.

Despite moving in similar circles, she was no relation to Elizabeth Gaskell.

Awards and honours
 CBE

References

External links 
 Photograph, c.1919
 Review of and extracts from Dimbleby's book

1853 births
1940 deaths
20th-century British philanthropists
English women philanthropists
Commanders of the Order of the British Empire
20th-century women philanthropists